The women's 400 metre individual medley competition at the 2015 European Games in Baku took place on 23 June at the Aquatic Palace.

Results

Heats
The heats were started at 10:59.

Final
The final was held at 17:43.

References

Women's 400 metre individual medley